Festuca pilgeri is a species of grass which is endemic to East Africa.

Description
The ligule is going around the eciliate membrane while the leaf-sheaths are smooth and have a hairy surface.

Spikelets are oblong and solitary with pedicelled fertile spikelets that carry 3–5 fertile florets. The glumes are chartaceous and keelless, have acute apexes, with only difference is in size. The palea have two veins and scaberulous keels. Flowers have three stamens  and hairy ovary while the fruits are caryopses with an additional pericarp and linear hilum. Both flowers and fruits have hairy apexes as well.

References

pilgeri
Flora of East Tropical Africa